Ixeridium is a genus of Asian flowering plants in the family Asteraceae.

 Species
 Ixeridium aculeolatum C.Shih - Tibet
 Ixeridium alpicola (Takeda) Pak & Kawano - Japan
 Ixeridium beauverdianum (H.Lév.) Spring. - Bhutan, Japan, Nepal, Thailand, Vietnam, China
 Ixeridium biparum C.Shih - southern China
 Ixeridium dentatum (Thunb. ex Thunb.) Tzvelev - Kuril Islands, China, Japan, Korea, Philippines, 
 Ixeridium gracile (DC.) Pak & Kawano - Nepal, Bhutan, Sikkim, Assam, Tibet, Yunnan
 Ixeridium kurilense Barkalov - Kuril Islands
 Ixeridium laevigatum (Blume) Pak & Kawano - China, Japan, Korea, Assam, Philippines, Indochina, Malaysia, Indonesia, New Guinea
 Ixeridium parvum (Kitam.) Pak & Kawano - Kyushu 
 Ixeridium sagittarioides (C.B.Clarke) Pak & Kawano - Yunnan, Bhutan, India, Myanmar, Nepal, Thailand
 Ixeridium sandsii D.J.N.Hind & R.J.Johns - New Guinea
 Ixeridium siamense (Kerr) Pak & Kawano - Thailand 
 Ixeridium subacaule (J.Kost.) Pak & Kawano - New Guinea
 Ixeridium transnokoense (Sasaki) Pak & Kawano - Taiwan
 Ixeridium yakuinsulare (Yahara) Pak & Kawano - Kyushu 
 Ixeridium yunnanense C.Shih - Yunnan

References

Cichorieae
Asteraceae genera